Caffè Americano (also known as Americano or American;) is a type of coffee drink prepared by diluting an espresso with hot water, giving it a similar strength to, but different flavor from, traditionally brewed coffee. Its strength varies with the number of shots of espresso and amount of water added. The name is also spelled with varying capitalization and use of diacritics: e.g., café americano.

In Italy, caffè americano may mean either espresso with hot water or long-filtered coffee, but the latter is more precisely called  ("café in the American style").

Origin 
"Americano" means "American" in Italian, Spanish and Portuguese. It entered the English language from Italian in the 1970s. "Caffè Americano" specifically is Italian for "American coffee". There is a popular belief that the name has its origins in World War II when American G.I.s in Italy diluted espresso with hot water to approximate the coffee to which they were accustomed.
However, the term appears earlier, e.g. in Somerset Maugham's Ashenden (1927).

Preparation
The drink consists of a single or double shot of espresso brewed with added water.

Long Black is an Australasian drink similar to the Americano (in contrast to Short Black for espresso), with an emphasis being placed on the order of preparation, adding water to the cup first before pouring the espresso on top.

In the western U.S., Italiano sometimes refers to a short Americano with equal amounts of espresso and water.

The hot water can be drawn directly from the same espresso machine that is used to brew the espresso, or from a separate water heater or kettle. Using the same heater makes a second one unnecessary, and the water can be drawn directly into the glass, either before (for a Long Black) or after (for an Americano) the espresso. Some espresso machines have a separate hot water spout for this purpose, while on others, the steam wand dispenses  it. Using a separate water heater is more practical in a commercial setting, as it frees the machine for other baristas, avoids disrupting the brew water's temperature, and reduces wear on specialized equipment.

Uses 
Most commonly, an Americano is used when one orders a brew-coffee sized drink from an espresso bar.

Americanos—particularly short, long-black-style Americanos—are also used within artisanal espresso preparation for beans that produce strong espresso. This is particularly used for single origin espresso, where many find that undiluted espresso shots can prove overpowering; and with lighter coffees and roasts not generally associated with espresso, such as beans of Ethiopian or Sumatran origins. For this preparation, generally a ratio of 1:1 espresso to water is used, to prevent excess dilution, with the espresso pulled directly into a cup with existing water to minimize disruption to the crema.

Variations 
The iced americano is made by combining espresso with cold water instead of hot water. A lungo is made by extracting an espresso shot for longer giving more volume, but also extracting some bitter flavours. A caffè crema is also made by extracting an espresso shot significantly longer than a lungo. A red eye is made with drip coffee instead of hot water, and may be called a shot in the dark.

Politics 
In 2016, the Russian prime minister Dmitry Medvedev humorously proposed for the coffee style to be 'renamed' to Russiano following deterioration of relations with the United States. The proposal, though humorous, had its implementation in one of Moscow's cafés.

See also 

 List of coffee drinks
 Long black

References

External links 

 

Coffee drinks
Italian words and phrases